The AACTA Screen Content Innovation Award is a special award presented by the Australian Academy of Cinema and Television Arts (AACTA) for "creativity within the screen industry" through the "successful employment of new media tools to either extend traditional formats or develop new formats, and in so doing create more rewarding and engaging audience experiences." The award was first presented by the Australian Film Institute (AFI) at the Australian Film Institute Awards (known commonly as the AFI Awards), before the academy was formed in 2011. The award, which was first presented in 2009, and again in 2011, is handed out at the discretion of the academy.

Winners

See also
AACTA Awards

References

External links
The Australian Academy of Cinema and Television Arts Official website

Awards established in 2009
S